Malta competed at the 2018 Commonwealth Games in the Gold Coast, Australia from April 4 to April 15, 2018.

Malta's team consisted of 25 athletes (15 men and 10 women) that competed in eight sports. However, only 24 athletes (14 men and 10 women) competed.

Wrestler Gary Giordimaina was the country's flag bearer during the opening ceremony.

Medalists

Competitors
The following is the list of number of competitors participating at the Games per sport/discipline.

Athletics (track and field)

Malta entered three athletes (two men and one woman).

Men
Field events

Women
Track & road events

Cycling

Malta entered two male cyclists.

Road
Men

Gymnastics

Malta entered one female gymnast.

Artistic

Women
Individual Qualification

Lawn bowls

Malta entered six lawn bowlers (two men and four women).

Men

Women

Shooting

Malta entered five sport shooters (four men and one woman).

Men

Women

Squash

Malta entered four squash athletes (two per gender).

Individual

Doubles

Weightlifting

Malta qualified one weightlifter.

Wrestling

Malta entered three male wrestlers. However, David Galea did not compete.

Men

See also
Malta at the 2018 Summer Youth Olympics

References

Nations at the 2018 Commonwealth Games
Malta at the Commonwealth Games
2018 in Maltese sport